SF NET Coffee House Network was an electronic bulletin board system created by Wayne Gregori in San Francisco, California in July 1991.

The network consisted of coin-operated, public access computers installed in many Bay Area coffee houses.  SF Net allowed individuals from all walks of life to communicate with each other via chat rooms and message boards.  Additionally, it provided games and access to FidoNet.

The coffee shop terminals were the culmination of a series of clever solutions to the problems of long-term remote placement in areas marked by low supervision and a young crowd.  According to the then-popular Boardwatch magazine, the inexpensive, hence replaceable PC XT sat inside a locked plywood cabinet with vandalism-resistant Zolatone  paint and "keyboard condoms," or spill-resistant rubber coverings.  Wayne Gregori hired David Lahti, the developer and operator of a popular San Francisco BBS, to develop and maintain the code base for the cafe table's communications software named, TableTalk, the BBS code base was maintained by Gregori.  Lahti and Gregori developed and introduced a handshake between the coffee shop terminals and the BBS to distinguish them from other callers, ensuring paying customers could continue to use dedicated lines.

Participating Coffee Shops 

SF Net discontinued service in August 1997.

See also 
 Community Memory, a public access system similar to SF Net

References 

Internet service providers of the United States